Bossiaea atrata is a species of flowering plant in the family Fabaceae and is endemic to the south-west of Western Australia. It is a dense, erect, spiny shrub with oblong to elliptic or almost round leaves, and orange-yellow and dark red flowers.

Description

Taxonomy and naming
Bossiaea atrata was first formally described in 2006 by James Henderson Ross in the journal Muelleria from specimens collected near Manmanning in 1990. The specific epithet (atrata) means "clothed in black" referring to the dark pedicels and sepals.

Distribution and habitat
This bossiaea occurs in scattered locations between Manmanning, Lake Grace and Lake King in the Avon Wheatbelt, Coolgardie, Esperance Plains and Mallee biogeographic regions of south-western Western Australia.

Conservation status
Bossiaea atrata is classified as "Priority Three" by the Government of Western Australia Department of Parks and Wildlife meaning that it is poorly known and known from only a few locations but is not under imminent threat.

References

atrata
Eudicots of Western Australia
Plants described in 2006